Balázs Szabó (born 22 February 1985 in Miskolc) is a Hungarian organist, harmonium d'art player and OrganExpert.

Biography
Balázs Szabó began his musical studies at the age of 15, graduated from the Franz Liszt Academy of Music in Budapest and went on to continue his studies in Germany and Italy. In 2010 he received the master organist title from the University of Music Wuerzburg with the mentoring of Dr. Christoph Bossert. He won first Prizes at three international organ competitions: St. Maurice, Switzerland(2007), Biarritz, France (2009) and the Internationale Orgelwoche Nürnberg (ION) (2011). He received the City of Miskolc Standard of Excellence Award, and the Junior Prima Prize. Since 2011 he holds a teaching position at the Franz Liszt Academy of Music in Budapest.

Balázs Szabó concluded OrganExpert training in Rome and Trossingen, the world’s only degree course for those who will consult church or national institutions as well as private people with organ projects (designing new organs and copies of historical instruments, supervising the maintenance, conservation and restoration of existing instruments)- presided over by the Vatican (Council of culture). He is one of the 5 graduated OrganExperts in the world.

Main awards
1. prizes at International organ competitions:
 Premier Prix in St. Maurice (Swiss) (2007)
 Grand Prix und Prix Spécial in Biarritz (France) (2009)
 1. Price at the 60. Internationalen Orgelwoche Nürnberg - ION Musica Sacra (2011).
 Second Prix d'Interpretation, de 24. Grand Prix de Chartres (France) (2014) 
 "Man of the Year" (2008, Hungary)
 the City of Miskolc Standard of Excellence Award(2010)
 Junior Prima Award (2010).

Recordings 
Max Reger: "per aspera ad astra" Die 7 Choralfantasien 2016, 2 SACD, aufgenommen an historische Originalinstrumente der Reger-Zeit (MDG 920 1945-6).

Publications 
- "Zur Orgelmusik Max Regers" in: Studien zur Orgelmusik Band 5, ed. M. Heinemann, Dr. J. Butz Bonn 2016. 

- „Länderbericht Ungarn“ in: Bernhard Billeter/Markus T. Funck/Michael G. Kaufmann (Hrsg.): Orgel/Orgue/Organo/Organ/2011, Dokumentation|Länderberichte-Dokumentation|Country reports, Verlag Organum Buch, DE-74613, Öhrigen 2014, 218-220.

- „Egy ideális orgona Budapesten“, Magyar Egyházzene XVIII (2010/2011) 71-83.

References

External links
 

Living people
Hungarian classical organists
Male classical organists
Hungarian classical pianists
Male classical pianists
1985 births
21st-century classical pianists
21st-century organists
21st-century Hungarian male musicians